Gymnopilus micromegas is a species of mushroom in the family Hymenogastraceae.

See also

List of Gymnopilus species

External links
Gymnopilus micromegas at Index Fungorum

micromegas
Fungi of North America